Faith Kasiray (born 20 December 1999) is a Papua New Guinean footballer who plays as a goalkeeper for Hekari United and the Papua New Guinea women's national team.

References

1999 births
Living people
Women's association football goalkeepers
Papua New Guinean women's footballers
Papua New Guinea women's international footballers
Footballers at the 2014 Summer Youth Olympics